Roger Anthony Lloyd-Pack (8 February 1944 – 16 January 2014) was an English actor. He is best known for playing Trigger in Only Fools and Horses from 1981 to 2003, and Owen Newitt in The Vicar of Dibley from 1994 to 2007. He later starred as Tom in The Old Guys with Clive Swift. He is also well known for the role of Barty Crouch Sr. in Harry Potter and the Goblet of Fire and for his appearances in Doctor Who as John Lumic in the episodes "Rise of the Cybermen" and "The Age of Steel". He was sometimes credited without the hyphen in his surname. He died in 2014 from pancreatic cancer.

Early life
Lloyd-Pack was born in Islington, London, the son of actor Charles Lloyd-Pack (1902–1983) and Ulrike Elisabeth (née Pulay, 1921–2000), an Austrian Jewish refugee who worked as a travel agent. He attended Bedales School near Petersfield in Hampshire, where he achieved A Level passes in English, French and Latin. He subsequently trained at the Royal Academy of Dramatic Art (RADA), where he worked with actors including Kenneth Cranham and Richard Wilson.

Career
Roger Lloyd-Pack began his acting career at Northampton's Royal Theatre, which he revisited when he appeared in the tour of Blue/Orange.

Only Fools and Horses 

On British television, he was best known for portraying "Trigger", Del Boy’s slow-witted “Village idiot” friend in the BBC sitcom Only Fools and Horses, from 1981 to 2003. 

Lloyd-Pack was cast by pure chance, an Only Fools and Horses executive producer, Ray Butt, hired him to portray Trigger after seeing him in a stage play, and had only attended that play to observe potential Del Boy actor Billy Murray.

Later Career 
He was also known for his role in The Vicar of Dibley as Owen Newitt and to international audiences his greatest fame was as Barty Crouch, Sr. in the film Harry Potter and the Goblet of Fire. In addition, he had a semi-regular role during the 1990s as the plumber Jake "The Klingon" Klinger, Ben Porter's arch-rival, in the sitcom 2 point 4 children.

In 2005, he appeared in the second series of ITV's Doc Martin as a farmer who held a grudge against Doctor Ellingham for what he believed was the malpractice-related death of his wife. In 2006, he played John Lumic and provided the voice of the Cyber-Controller in two episodes of Doctor Who, "Rise of the Cybermen" and "The Age of Steel", opposite David Tennant, who had played his son in the same Harry Potter film. Lloyd-Pack's final TV appearance was in Law & Order: UK as Alex Greene.

He voiced the pre-match build-up montage video shown ahead of all Tottenham Hotspur's home matches which is still played today.

In June 2008, he appeared as a guest on the BBC's The Politics Show, arguing the case for better-integrated public transport (specifically railways), and, in January 2012, he and fellow actor Sarah Parish supported a campaign to raise £1million for The Bridge School in Islington.

In 2012, he portrayed the Duke of Buckingham in the play Richard III, and, in 2013, portrayed Sir Andrew Aguecheek in Twelfth Night, both plays by William Shakespeare.

Personal life
Lloyd-Pack was married twice: first to Sheila Ball, from whom he was divorced in 1972, and secondly to the poet and dramatist Jehane Markham (the daughter of David Markham), whom he married in 2000. He had a daughter, actress Emily Lloyd and three sons. He latterly lived in Kentish Town, north London, but also had a home near Fakenham in Norfolk.

Lloyd-Pack was a supporter of Tottenham Hotspur. 

He was an honorary patron of the London children's charity Scene & Heard.

In a 2008 interview, when asked what profession he would have chosen aside from acting, Lloyd-Pack said: "Psychiatrist or a psychoanalyst or something in the psycho world because I've always been interested in that... or I might have been a photographer... I also would have loved to have been a musician." In that same interview, he listed his favourite directors as Peter Gill, Harold Pinter, Richard Eyre, Thea Sharrock and Tina Packer, and listed actor Paul Scofield as both a favourite and influence.

Political Views 
Lloyd-Pack supported the Labour Party and campaigned for Ken Livingstone in the 2012 London mayoral election. However, in 2013, he signed a letter in The Guardian stating he had withdrawn his support from the Labour Party, in favour of a new party of the left.

Death and tributes

Lloyd-Pack died of pancreatic cancer at his home in Kentish Town aged 69 on 16 January 2014. His funeral was held at the church of St. Paul's, Covent Garden. It was attended by Sir David Jason, Nicholas Lyndhurst, John Challis and Sue Holderness. His body was buried at Highgate Cemetery East.

Tributes 
Nigel Havers, Stephen Rea, Miranda Richardson, Alison Steadman, Kathy Burke and Joely Richardson paid tribute to him.

In March that year, the Sport Relief special of Only Fools and Horses was dedicated to the memory of both Lloyd-Pack and John Sullivan. Similarly, the final episode of the lockdown edition of The Vicar of Dibley ended with a tribute just before the closing credits reading, "In loving memory of Liz, John, Emma and Roger", paying tribute to him and three other late Dibley cast members (Liz Smith, John Bluthal and Emma Chambers).

Filmography

Film

Television

Stage
Wild Honey (1984) by Anton Chekhov, playing the part of Osip
Kafka's Dick by Alan Bennett, playing the part of  Kafka
Blue/Orange by Joe Penhall
'Art'
Dick Whittington, pantomime by Mark Ravenhill at the Barbican Centre
One for the Road
Dealer's Choice by Patrick Marber, playing the part of Ash
The Last Laugh, by Kōki Mitani (English version of Warai no Daigaku), playing the part of The Censor, Japan, 2007
The Trojan Women (2012), Caroline Bird's adaptation of the tragedy by Euripides, playing the part of Poseidon, at the Gate Theatre, Notting Hill, London
Richard III (2012) by William Shakespeare, playing the part of  Duke of Buckingham at the Globe Theatre, South Bank, London
Twelfth Night (2013) by William Shakespeare playing the part of Sir Andrew Aguecheek

References

External links

Roger Lloyd-Pack (Aveleyman)
BBC biography
BBC interview about appearing in Doctor Who

Roger Lloyd Pack Archive at V&A

1944 births
2014 deaths
20th-century English male actors
21st-century English male actors
Alumni of RADA
Burials at Highgate Cemetery
Deaths from pancreatic cancer
English male film actors
English male stage actors
English male television actors
English people of Austrian-Jewish descent
Male actors from London
People educated at Bedales School
People from Islington (district)
Deaths from cancer in England
British male comedy actors